Armand Lévy may refer to:
Armand Lévy (mineralogist) (1795–1841), French mathematician and mineralogist
Armand Lévy (activist) (1827–1891), French lawyer and journalist